Illela is a Local Government Area in Sokoto State, Nigeria. Its headquarters are in the town of Illela.

Illela shares a border with the Republic of Niger to the north. It has an area of 1,246 km and a population of 150,489 at the 2006 census.

Postal 
The postal code of the area is 843.

References 

Local Government Areas in Sokoto State